53 Armoured Regiment is an armoured regiment of the Indian Army Armoured Corps.

Formation
The regiment was raised on 1 April 2002 during Operation Parakram. Lieutenant General GD Singh was the first Colonel of the Regiment. Lieutenant General Karanbir Singh Brar, Director General Armoured Corps, is the current Colonel of the Regiment.

Gallantry awards
The regiment has won the following gallantry awards - 
Sena Medal - Dafadar Bhagwat Prasad Yadav
COAS Commendation Cards - 2

References

Armoured and cavalry regiments of the Indian Army from 1947
Military units and formations established in 2002